Andy Strouse (born 22 June 1970) is a former U.S. soccer forward who earned three caps with the United States in 1992.

Youth
In 1989, Strouse graduated from Edison High School.  He is a member of the Edison Hall of Fame. He played club soccer with the North Huntington Beach Untouchables.  He attended Orange Coast College, playing on the men's soccer team in 1989 and 1990.  In 1989, OCC won the California Junior College Soccer Championship.  He then transferred to Southern Methodist University, playing on the men's soccer team in 1991 and 1992.

Professional
In 1994, Strouse played for the Anaheim Splash in the Continental Indoor Soccer League  In 1995, he was with the Los Angeles Salsa U-23 in the USISL.  In 1996, he was back with the Anaheim Splash.

National team
Strouse played his first game with the national team in a February 12, 1992, scoreless tie with Costa Rica.  His next game was six days later in a 2–0 loss to El Salvador.  His last game was a 5–0 win over China on April 4, 1992.  He came on for Eric Wynalda in the 82nd minute.

He coached the Edison High School boys soccer team from at least 1994 to 1999.

References

1970 births
Living people
American soccer coaches
American soccer players
Anaheim Splash players
Continental Indoor Soccer League players
Los Angeles Salsa U-23 players
SMU Mustangs men's soccer players
United States men's international soccer players
USISL players
Association football forwards
Soccer players from California